Shchekino, also romanized Shchyokino, is a town and the administrative center of Shchyokinsky District in Tula Oblast, Russia, located on the Moscow—Simferopol highway (M2),  south of Tula, the administrative center of the oblast. Population:    72,000 (1977).

History
It was founded in 1871 in connection with the development of brown coal deposits and soon supplanted Krapivna as the main settlement in the district. It was granted town status in 1938.

Administrative and municipal status
Within the framework of administrative divisions, Shchekino serves as the administrative center of Shchyokinsky District. As an administrative division, it is incorporated within Shchyokinsky District as Shchekino Town Under District Jurisdiction. As a municipal division, Shchekino Town Under District Jurisdiction is incorporated within Shchyokinsky Municipal District as Shchekino Urban Settlement.

References

Sources

Notes

Cities and towns in Tula Oblast